Wolt is a Finnish technology company known for its delivery platform for food and merchandise. On Wolt's apps (iOS and Android) or website, customers can order food and household goods from the platform's restaurant and merchant partners, and either pick up their order or have it delivered by the platform's courier partners. Wolt also runs its own chain of grocery stores called Wolt Market. Wolt is headquartered in Helsinki.

In May 2022, Wolt was acquired by the American technology company DoorDash. DoorDash operates in 27 countries today, 23 of which are with the Wolt product and brand.

History 
Wolt was founded in 2014 by 6 founders, including Miki Kuusi, the former CEO of Slush and CEO of Wolt. Kuusi is also responsible for DoorDash's business outside the US since May 2022, when DoorDash acquired Wolt. 

As of November 2022, Wolt operates in 23 countries and over 300 cities, including Helsinki, Tokyo, Tel Aviv and Berlin. Wolt has over 70,000 merchant partners, 150,000 courier partners and 20 million registered customers. Wolt has over 7,000 employees across its offices in 23 countries.

In November 2021, it was announced that Wolt was being merged into DoorDash through an exchange of shares, giving Wolt shareholders a minority of shares in DoorDash for a deal worth US $8.1 billion. On 31 May 2022, the acquisition was completed.

Before the DoorDash acquisition, Wolt raised $856M in funding from investors including ICONIQ Capital, Highland Europe, 83North, EQT Ventures, Tiger Global, DST Global, Prosus, KKR, Coatue, Inventure, Lifeline Ventures, Supercell founder & CEO Ilkka Paananen and Nokia Chairman Risto Siilasmaa, among others. 

Wolt was ranked second in the 2020 edition of the FT:1000 Europe's Fastest Growing Companies 2020 published by the Financial Times.

Timeline 
 2014: Wolt was founded in Helsinki, Finland.
 2015: Wolt first launched in Helsinki as pick-up only.
 2016: Wolt added delivery to the platform and expanded to Sweden and Estonia. Wolt did some experimenting with self-driving delivery robots in Tallinn in cooperation with Starship Technologies.
 2017: Wolt launched in Denmark, Latvia and Lithuania.
 2018: Wolt launched in Croatia, Czech Republic, Norway, Hungary, Georgia, Israel and Poland.
 2019: Wolt launched in Serbia, Greece, Azerbaijan, Slovakia, Slovenia and Kazakhstan.
 2020: Wolt launched in Japan, Cyprus, Malta and Germany. Wolt’s own chain of grocery stores, Wolt Market, was launched in Helsinki. 
 2022: The transaction closed and Wolt was acquired by DoorDash.

This article has been edited by a Wolt employee in January 2023.

References

External links 
 

Online food ordering
Online retailers of Finland
2014 establishments in Finland
Retail companies established in 2014
Transport companies established in 2014
Internet properties established in 2014
Finnish brands
2022 mergers and acquisitions